Pittosporum viridulatum is a critically endangered species of plant in the Pittosporaceae family. It is endemic to the Nilgiris in Tamil Nadu, India.

References

viridulatum
Flora of Tamil Nadu
Critically endangered plants
Taxonomy articles created by Polbot
Taxobox binomials not recognized by IUCN